"Sparkling" is a song by South Korean singer Chungha. It was released on July 11, 2022, through MNH and 88rising as the title track from Chungha's second Korean-language studio album, Bare & Rare.

Composition and lyrics
"Sparkling" was written by Chungha and BXM, and composed by BXM and Prime Time. It runs for three minutes and six seconds. The lyrics "You make me sparkle, I'll be your sparkle" is like the relationship between Byulharang and Chungha, shining on each other. This fetching piece features sound like a refreshing soda pop, with its identity of hyper-vibe on top of a fast BPM around 160. Like the first sip of an ice cold drink on a hot summer day, the song expresses the clear and cool feeling of a cold and tangy pop. The fast mood could easily seem as light but by capturing the fast mood with Chungha's strong voice, this cool and sparkle track was completed. The arpeggio of the analog synthesizer achieves harmony with the retro but trendy drumline, and by adding in the electric guitar, the chorus also realizes a tough but witty rich sound. And Chungh's chameleonic changes in emotions corresponding with the lyrics can be a key point of this song.

Credits and personnel
Credits adapted from the description section of the music video and Melon.

 Lyrics by BXM and Chungha
 Composed by BXM and Prime Time
 Arranged by BXM
 Drums Performed by Hangsuk Jwa
 EP Performed by Gilbeom Lee
 Guitar Performed by Moohyuk Byun
 Background vocals by Ashley Alisha and Chungha
 Directed by BXM and Fuxxy
 Recorded by Jung Eunkyeng at Ingrid Studio
 Mixed by DRK (Assist. Kim Junsang, Ji Minwoo) @ Koko Sound Studio
 Mastered by Kwon Nam Woo @ 821 Sound Mastering
xx

Charts

Weekly charts

Monthly charts

Accolades

Release history

References

 

 
2022 songs
2022 singles
Chungha songs
MNH Entertainment singles
Korean-language songs